Loretta Yu (born December 22, 1982) is a Canadian actress of Chinese descent.

Early life 
On December 22, 1982, Yu was born in Montreal, Quebec and grew up in Nova Scotia, working in the family restaurant.

Education 
Yu received a BA degree in theatre from Acadia University.

Career 
Yu took part in some Halifax productions, including Jason Eisener's fake trailer for Hobo with a Shotgun which was screened with the film Grindhouse and Jay Dahl's film There are Monsters. Yu moved to Toronto and appeared in various television series including Degrassi: The Next Generation, The Listener, Hemlock Grove and Blood and Water. She also appeared in the 2008 made-for-television movie The Circuit and the 2008 Canadian comedy Nonsense Revolution. In 2017-2018, Yu played Ana in the Canadian web-series Begin/Again. From 2017 to 2019, Yu played Cai in Dino Dana.

She appears in an episode of the 2021 drama series Cam Boy.

References

External links 
 
 

1982 births
Living people
Actresses from Montreal
Canadian actresses of Chinese descent
Canadian film actresses
Canadian television actresses